Dectodesis comis is a species of tephritid or fruit flies in the genus Dectodesis of the family Tephritidae.

Distribution
Madagascar

References

Tephritinae
Insects described in 1954
Diptera of Africa